Joel Bomgaars (born February 6, 1980), known professionally as Joel Bomgar, is an American businessman and politician. He is the founder of Bomgar Corporation, a technology company. He serves in the Mississippi House of Representatives, representing the 58th district.

Early life
Joel Bomgaars was born on February 6, 1980. He graduated from Belhaven University. He served in the Mississippi Air National Guard.

Career

Business 
In 2003, Joel Bomgar founded Bomgar Corporation, a company that provides software-based, remote tech-support solutions. Bomgar grew the company to provide services to clients in around 65 countries and has a revenue of around $50 million, as of 2014. Bomgar stepped down from CEO to chairman of the board after an equity firm purchased a majority stake in the company.

Bomgar served on the Steering Committee of the Mississippi Economic Council Blueprint Mississippi, the statewide long-range economic development plan. Additionally, he served on the Boards of Trustees of the Madison County Foundation and his alma mater, Belhaven University.

As of May 2022, he is the president of Prospera, a company that is developing the libertarian-inspired semi-autonomous city of Próspera on the Honduran island of Roatan.

Politics 
Bomgar has served as a member of the Mississippi House of Representatives since January 2016. He represents the 58th district, which includes parts of Madison, Mississippi and Ridgeland, Mississippi.

In 2020, Bomgar voted yes on the bill to change the Mississippi State Flag.

Personal life
Bomgar is married to Rachel Roberts. They reside in Madison, Mississippi.

Bomgar is of Presbyterian faith.

References

Living people
1980 births
People from Sioux Center, Iowa
People from Madison, Mississippi
Belhaven University alumni
American technology company founders
Businesspeople from Mississippi
Republican Party members of the Mississippi House of Representatives
21st-century American politicians